This is a list of presidents of Brazil by time in office. The basis of the list is the difference between dates. Since the Proclamation of the Republic in 1889, there have been 39 presidencies and 36 presidents, as Getúlio Vargas, Ranieri Mazzilli and Luiz Inácio Lula da Silva served non-consecutive terms.  Of the individuals elected president, one (Dilma Rousseff) was impeached, four (Deodoro da Fonseca, Getúlio Vargas, Jânio Quadros, and Fernando Collor) resigned and three (Júlio Prestes, Pedro Aleixo, and Tancredo Neves) never took office, while several others died while in office. Carlos Luz spent the shortest time in office, and Getúlio Vargas spent the longest (by both total time and consecutive time). All presidents listed, including the ones that did not take office, are present in the official list.

Since the current Constitution enacted in 1988, 7 people sworn into office as President of Brazil.

Presidents by time in office

Notes

References

Brazil, Presidents

Presidents